The 107th Infantry Division (107. Infanterie-Division) was a unit of the Imperial German Army in World War I.  The division was formed on June 1, 1915, and organized over the next few weeks.  It was part of a wave of new infantry divisions formed in 1915.  The division was disbanded in 1919 during the demobilization of the German Army after World War I.

The division was formed primarily from the excess infantry regiments of existing divisions which were being triangularized.  The division's 213th Infantry Brigade was formerly the 98th Reserve Infantry Brigade of the 49th Reserve Division, and came to the division with the 227th Reserve Infantry Regiment.  The 52nd Reserve Infantry Regiment came from the 5th Reserve Division and the 232nd Reserve Infantry Regiment came from the 50th Reserve Division.

Combat chronicle
The 107th Infantry Division initially served on the Eastern Front, seeing its first action in the Battle of Lemberg (now Lviv) and later participating in the capture of Brest-Litovsk and of Pinsk.  It was then transferred south to participate in the Serbian Campaign.  After a brief respite on the Macedonian front, the division went back to Russia at the beginning of January 1916.  In November 1917, the division was sent to the Western Front, entering the line in the German "Siegfried" position.  It fought in the tank Battle of Cambrai in November 1917 and in the German counterattack in December.  In April 1918, the division participated in the German spring offensive, fighting in the First Battle of the Somme (1918), also known as the Second Battle of the Somme (to distinguish it from the 1916 battle).  It remained in the Somme salient and fought against various Allied counteroffensives.  The division moved to the St. Mihiel salient in September and then occupied the line in the Woëvre region. In October, it met the Allied Meuse-Argonne Offensive.  The division remained in the line until the end of the war.  Allied intelligence rated the division as third class.

Order of battle on formation
The 107th Infantry Division was formed as a triangular division.  The order of battle of the division on June 3, 1915, was as follows:

213. Infanterie-Brigade
Reserve-Infanterie-Regiment Nr. 52
Reserve-Infanterie-Regiment Nr. 227
Reserve-Infanterie-Regiment Nr. 232
1.Eskadron/Kürassier-Regiment Nr. 6
2.Eskadron/Kürassier-Regiment Nr. 6
Feldartillerie-Regiment Nr. 213
Fußartillerie-Batterie Nr. 107
Pionier-Kompanie Nr. 213

Late-war order of battle
The division underwent relatively few organizational changes over the course of the war.  Cavalry was reduced, artillery and signals commands were formed, and combat engineer support was expanded to a full pioneer battalion.  The order of battle on March 2, 1918, was as follows:

213.Infanterie-Brigade
Reserve-Infanterie-Regiment Nr. 52
Reserve-Infanterie-Regiment Nr. 227
Reserve-Infanterie-Regiment Nr. 232
3.Eskadron/Ulanen-Regiment Nr. 1
Artillerie-Kommandeur 157
Feldartillerie-Regiment Nr. 213
I. Bataillon/Kgl. Bayerisches 6. Fußartillerie-Regiment
Pionier-Bataillon Nr. 107
Pionier-Kompanie Nr. 213
4. Kompanie/Pionier-Bataillon Nr. 21
Minenwerfer-Kompanie Nr. 107
Divisions-Nachrichten-Kommandeur 107

References
 107. Infanterie-Division (Chronik 1915/1918) - Der erste Weltkrieg
 Hermann Cron et al., Ruhmeshalle unserer alten Armee (Berlin, 1935)
 Hermann Cron, Geschichte des deutschen Heeres im Weltkriege 1914-1918 (Berlin, 1937)
 Günter Wegner, Stellenbesetzung der deutschen Heere 1825-1939. (Biblio Verlag, Osnabrück, 1993), Bd. 1
 Histories of Two Hundred and Fifty-One Divisions of the German Army which Participated in the War (1914-1918), compiled from records of Intelligence section of the General Staff, American Expeditionary Forces, at General Headquarters, Chaumont, France 1919 (1920)

Notes

Infantry divisions of Germany in World War I
Military units and formations established in 1915
Military units and formations disestablished in 1919
1915 establishments in Germany